The Saintonge Regiment, also known as the 85e Regiment of the Line, was raised in the year 1684 in the province of Saintonge, France. From 1763 to 1768 the regiment served in the West indies and French Guiana. In 1780 the regiment was sent with Jean-Baptiste Donatien de Vimeur, comte de Rochambeau to help the United States during the American Revolutionary War. The regiment took part in the Siege of Yorktown in 1781. In 1782 the regiment returned to the West Indies and then back to France in 1783. Following the French Revolution the regiment became the 82e Regiment of Infantry.

References

Military units and formations of France in the American Revolutionary War
Military units and formations established in 1684

Military units and formations disestablished in 1792
Line infantry regiments of the Ancien Régime